is a castle structure in Hamada, Shimane Prefecture, Japan.

Current
The castle is now only ruins, with some stone walls and earthworks. In 2017, the castle was listed as one of the Continued Top 100 Japanese Castles.

Literature

References

Castles in Shimane Prefecture
Former castles in Japan